William Mallory Bagwell (February 24, 1895 – October 5, 1976), nicknamed "Big Bill", was a pinch hitter and left fielder in Major League Baseball. He played for the Boston Braves and Philadelphia Athletics during the 1920s. Bagwell was 6 feet, 1 inch tall and weighed 175 pounds.

Career
Bagwell started his professional baseball career in 1920 in the Class D level Louisiana State League, with the Alexandria Tigers. That season, he had a .344 batting average in 33 games. Bagwell then spent two years in the Southwestern League. In 1921, he batted .357, and in 1922, he batted .402 and led the league in batting average, hits (217), and total bases (323).

In October 1922, Bagwell was selected by the Boston Braves in the Rule 5 draft. He played for both the Braves and the Eastern League's Worcester Panthers in 1923. With Boston, he batted .290 in 56 games; with Worcester, he batted .453 in 49 games to lead the Eastern League in batting average.

The Braves released Bagwell in April 1924. He spent one season in the Texas League, batted .367 with a career-high 37 home runs there, and then returned to the majors in 1925 with the Philadelphia Athletics. Bagwell spent nearly the whole season as a pinch hitter for Philadelphia. He appeared in 36 games and went 15 for 50 (.300) at the plate.

In 1926, Bagwell played for the Pacific Coast League's Portland Beavers. He batted .391 to lead his league in batting average for the third time. In 1927, however, Bagwell's average fell to .292 for Portland. He bounced around various minor leagues for the next few years before retiring from professional baseball after the 1930 season.

In his 11-year career, Bagwell hit .294 in the major leagues and .360 in the minor leagues. He died in Choudrant, Louisiana, in 1976.

References

External links

1895 births
1976 deaths
Major League Baseball left fielders
Boston Braves players
Philadelphia Athletics players
Pittsburg Pirates players
Salina Millers players
Independence Producers players
Worcester Panthers players
Galveston Sand Crabs players
Portland Beavers players
Dallas Steers players
Beaumont Exporters players
Monroe Drillers players
Asheville Tourists players
Minneapolis Millers (baseball) players
Louisiana Tech Bulldogs baseball players
Baseball players from Louisiana
People from Choudrant, Louisiana
Alexandria Tigers players